BBC Radio Northampton is the BBC's local radio station serving the county of Northamptonshire.

It broadcasts on FM, DAB, digital TV and via BBC Sounds from studios on Abington Street in Northampton.

According to RAJAR, the station has a weekly audience of 68,000 listeners and a 6.3% share as of December 2022.

Opening
The station was launched at 6:45am on 16 June 1982 on 1107 AM and 96.6 FM, with Jon Beynon's programme Start the Day, the first piece of music being John Williams's Superman theme, followed by Work That Body by Diana Ross.

The first outside broadcast followed on 17 June 1982, and the official opening was performed by the Duke of Gloucester.

The station was renamed BBC Northampton in 1990, but then reverted to BBC Radio Northampton on 3 April 2000.

Transmitters
The station has two FM transmitters, with 104.2 FM broadcast from the Boughton Green Road area of Northampton, and 103.6 FM broadcast from a mast near the village of Geddington. Listeners can tune into 104.2 in the south and west of the county (including Northampton and surrounding area), whereas 103.6 serves the north and east (including Kettering and Corby).

Along the M1, the station can be heard on 104.2 FM from Milton Keynes to Copt Oak (near Leicester). There is no longer a MW frequency, but the station went digital on DAB in March 2013. Radio Northampton was originally available on 1107 kHz MW across the county from a transmitter at Kings Heath; this was reallocated to Virgin Radio using 1233 kHz. For the north-east of the county near Oundle, the Peterborough transmitter has Radio Cambridgeshire on DAB from a NOW Digital multiplex.

The transmitter at Daventry on Borough Hill has BBC National DAB, Digital One 11D and an MXR West Midlands 12A multiplex (since August 2001). Daventry was the BBC's first Long wave transmitter, which began broadcasting on 27 July 1925. It had not been previously used by the BBC since 1978.

In addition, BBC Radio Northampton also broadcasts on Freeview TV channel 734 in the BBC East Midlands region and the Western half of the BBC East region. It also streams online via BBC Sounds.

DAB licence
On 11 October 2007, the DAB licence was awarded to NOW Digital. MuxCo had also bid for the licence.

NOW Digital expected to start broadcasting from the three transmitters at Northampton, Geddington and Daventry in September 2008, however transmissions eventually began on 28 March 2013 on DAB channel 10C. The line-up was identical to that of the neighbouring Herts, Beds and Bucks multiplex, consisting of local Northamptonshire stations (BBC Radio Northampton: countywide, Connect FM: Wellingborough, Kettering, Corby) and national stations (Capital, Gold and Heart: Northants, Bucks, MK, Beds and Herts regional service), along with stations aimed at the Herts, Beds and Bucks area (BBC Three Counties Radio and MKFM).

From February 2015, OFCOM approved the separation of the Northamptonshire multiplex from the Hertfordshire, Bedfordshire and Buckinghamshire multiplex, resulting in the removal of BBC Three Counties Radio, BOB fm and MKFM from the Northamptonshire multiplex, and the removal of BBC Radio Northampton from the Herts, Beds and Bucks multiplex.

Sports coverage
BBC Radio Northampton airs extensive sports coverage, led by Sports Editor Graham McKechnie. Football commentators include Tim Oglethorpe, Martin Smith and Terry Angus for Northampton Town, Peter Short for Kettering Town, Chris Barrett at Brackley/Rushden and Chuck Middleton at Corby. McKechnie commentates on Northampton Saints rugby with Lennie Newman and Ian Hunter.
Northants Steelbacks cricket commentators include McKechnie, Andrew Radd and Lee Daggett.

Matches are covered on FM, DAB or both, with additional coverage on-line. The sports team is supplemented by News Editor Laura Cook who has a particular interest in motor sport and horse racing.
The station broadcasts 2 weekly sports shows from 6 - 7PM, The Saints Show on Wednesday presented by McKechnie and Newman, focusing on a guest from Northampton Saints, The Cobblers Show/The Cricket Show on Thursday.

Programming
Local programming is produced and broadcast from the BBC's Northampton studios from 6am - 10pm on Mondays - Saturdays and from 6am - 2pm on Sundays.

Off-peak programming, including the late show from 10pm - 1am, originates from BBC Radio Norfolk, BBC Three Counties Radio and BBC Essex.

During the station's downtime, BBC Radio Northampton simulcasts overnight programming from BBC Radio 5 Live and BBC Radio London.

Notable former presenters
 Liz Kershaw – former breakfast show presenter; 2002: 2005–2010. now a presenter on BBC 6 Music.
 Howard Stableford – went on to present the BBC television series Tomorrow's World
 Stuart Linnell - veteran radio & TV presenter, former presenter of the breakfast and drivetime shows, also heard on BBC CWR.

ViLoR
ViLoR (Virtual Local Radio) is the name of a BBC project that uses computer virtualisation and audio-over-IP to reduce the amount of equipment at a radio station. In 2014 Radio Northampton became the first station to operate in this way.
 ViLoR has been implemented at all BBC Local Radio stations (except BBC Radio Manchester and some studios at BBC Sussex and Surrey).

Satellite Van
Like other BBC local radio stations Radio Northampton no longer uses a car with a pump-up mast to get reports from locations around its area and instead uses a van with a satellite dish.

Notable events

Involvement in U.S. presidential inauguration 
BBC Northampton operates the Twitter account "@BBCNorthampton". A tweet was sent from the Twitter account on the day after the President's Inauguration, claiming that Donald Trump had been shot, but later the BBC confirmed that the account had been hacked.

References

External links
 
 History of local radio in Northamptonshire
 David's Transmitter World
 MDS975's Transmitter Map
 Geddington transmitter
 Northampton transmitter

Audio clips
 Jingle package
 2002 jingle

Northampton
Mass media in Northamptonshire
Northampton
Kettering
Rushden
Wellingborough
Radio stations in Northamptonshire